Ugo Morin (February 7, 1901 – January 1, 1968) was an Italian mathematician and antifascist.

Biography
Morin was born in Trieste in 1901. His family was originally from Mali Lošinj. He got his first degree at the University of Padova in 1926; in 1933 he was a lecturer of geometry. In 1935 he became a professor at Padova's University, and from 1942 to 1945 he taught at the University of Florence (analytical geometry). From 1946 he was again a professor in Padova, where he died in 1968. He was also an author of many scientific articles about classical algebraic geometry and abstract algebra.

While he was working in Florence, he was an active antifascist: he was organising the Partito d’Azione and his militia, participating actively with the Resistance, organising the clandestine Partito d’Azione and Giustizia e Libertà; in 1945 he was the chairman of the Tuscan CLN (National Liberation Committee).

References

External links

Biography (Italian) PRISTEM (Università Bocconi)

1901 births
1967 deaths
20th-century Italian mathematicians
Italian anti-fascists